Víctor Ramos may refer to:

Víctor Alberto Ramos (born 1945), Argentine geologist
Víctor Ramos (footballer, born 1958), Argentine football striker
Victor Ramos (boxer) (born 1970), retired East Timorese boxer
Victor Ramos (footballer, born 1989), Brazilian football centre-back